Alpha-humulene 10-hydroxylase (CYP71BA1) is an enzyme with systematic name alpha-humulene,NADPH:oxygen 10-oxidoreductase. This enzyme catalyses the following chemical reaction

 alpha-humulene + O2 + NADPH + H+  10-hydroxy-alpha-humulene + NADP+ + H2O

Alpha-humulene 10-hydroxylase requires cytochrome P-450.

References

External links 
 

EC 1.14.13